Schizocarpum parviflorum is a species of plant in the genus Schizocarpum. It is native to several parts of Mexico.

References

External links

Cucurbitoideae